Roger Robert Grove (June 19, 1908December 19, 1986) was a professional American football running back in the National Football League. He played five seasons for the Green Bay Packers including the 1931 team that won the NFL Championship. He lettered at Michigan State in 1928, 1929 and 1930.

External links

1908 births
1986 deaths
People from Greenville, Ohio
Players of American football from Ohio
American football running backs
Michigan State Spartans football players
Green Bay Packers players